The Misunderstood were an American psychedelic rock band originating from Riverside, California in the mid-1960s.  The band moved to London early in their career, and although they recorded only a handful of songs before being forced to disband, they are considered highly influential in the then-emerging genre.

Creem, in their September 2004 review, wrote, "The saga of the Misunderstood is one of the most unbelievable, heartbreaking, and unlikely stories in the entire history of rock."

Classic Rocks June 2010 issue stated, "The truth is that this band (the Misunderstood) were so far out on their own, so individual and innovative that you can only wonder at the set of circumstances that conspired to prevent them from becoming the iconic name that was surely their destiny."

History 
The band began in 1963 as one of many garage bands formed in the US in the wake of the British Invasion.  They moved to London in 1966, with the assistance of their manager, John Peel, who would later gain fame as an influential BBC Radio DJ. In the UK, they recruited Englishman Tony Hill on rhythm guitar. Hill and singer Rick Brown formed a songwriting team. Bass player Steve Whiting was also involved in developing material for the band.

The band was influenced by and often compared to the Yardbirds, and in 2004 were called "the American Yardbirds" by Rolling Stone. Distinctive features of the band's sound included the steel guitar of Glenn Ross Campbell and the innovative style of Whiting, known for his use of slide, fuzz tone and distortion.

Fontana Records introduced the band with a four-song live performance in London's Philips Studios.  British media response was positive, but at this juncture it was decided that Campbell, Whiting, and Moe should go to Europe to sort out their British visas and work permits, while Brown returned to California for his draft.

In London they released their second single, "I Can Take You to the Sun", before being forced to disband. They had only recorded six tracks in London.

In spite of their relatively small output, many musicians consider them to be influential pioneers of the acid style of rock music. Head Heritage in a 2006 review wrote, "The Misunderstood's material extended far beyond the reach of the period in which it was conceived. The extraordinarily advanced tracks on side one from 1966 reveal them as one of the earliest and most original probes into psychedelic rock."

John Peel 
British DJ John Peel championed the Misunderstood's music throughout his entire career. Shortly before his death, in an interview with Index Magazine, Peel stated, "If I had to list the ten greatest performances I've seen in my life, one would be the Misunderstood at Pandora's Box, Hollywood, 1966. My god, they were a great band!"

Visual feedback 
The Misunderstood are known for having pioneered the live light show. Campbell initially soldered a guitar jack to a car light bulb and plugged this into the extension output behind each amp. This simple idea produced visual music, as the response between the guitars and the lights plugged into the amps was identical. They first showed this feature at the Hi Ho Club in Riverside in early 1966. They also played with lights at the Marquee Club in London in mid 1966. An advanced, multicolored, large scale version of this "light show" or "visual sound" system was being planned in London when the band were forced to retire. Another feature of their visuals was getting all three guitars feeding back using different tremolo settings, thereby leaving the stage flashing with musical lights.

Later period 
Glenn Ross Campbell went on to Juicy Lucy, while Tony Hill formed High Tide and recorded a solo album titled Inexactness.

In 1982, Glenn Ross Campbell and Rick Brown reunited as "Influence", and in 1983 recorded two self-penned tracks, "No Survivors" and "Queen of Madness", for UK's Rough Trade Records. They disbanded in 1985 when Campbell moved to New Zealand and Brown moved to Thailand.

Cherry Red Records (UK) released three albums of the Misunderstood's music, viz., Before the Dream Faded (BRED 32) in 1982, The Legendary Goldstar Album (CDM RED 142) in 1997, and a full album of the Misunderstood's later material under the name of The Misunderstood: Broken Road (CDM RED 147) in 1998.

In 2004, Ugly Things Records (USA) issued another full album of previously unreleased tracks named The Lost Acetates 1965–1966, that received international media coverage.

A motion picture screen play (The Misunderstood: WGA 977444) about the band and Brown's adventures was written by rock historian Mike Stax (editor of Ugly Things) in 2002, and is under revision.

A novel: Like, Misunderstood – based on the script was published in October 2007.

Musical recognition 
In his "Peelenium" (Greatest Songs of the 20th Century) John Peel lists the band's song, "I Can Take You to the Sun" for 1966.
 "I Can Take You to the Sun" appears as number 6 in Record Collectors book, "100 Greatest Psychedelic Records", a list in chronological order.
Mojo April 2009 – "I Can See For Miles: A-Z" lists the Misunderstood for "M".
June 11, 2010, Classic Rock named the Misunderstood as No. 18 in their list of "Cult Heroes".

Discography

References

External links 
The Misunderstood website

American blues rock musical groups
Musical groups established in 1965
Musical groups from California
Musical groups from London
Psychedelic rock music groups from California
American expatriates in the United Kingdom
Fontana Records artists
Cherry Red Records artists